Jason Wu (born September 27, 1982) is a Taiwanese-Canadian artist and fashion designer based in New York City. Born in Taiwan and raised in Vancouver, he studied fashion design at Parsons School of Design, and trained under Narciso Rodriguez before launching his own line.

He is best known for designing the dresses of Michelle Obama on several occasions, including those worn during the first and second inauguration of American President Barack Obama.

Early life
Jason Wu was born in Yunlin, Taiwan and emigrated to Vancouver, British Columbia, Canada at age nine. He attended Eaglebrook School in Deerfield, Massachusetts and Loomis Chaffee in Windsor, Connecticut and studied abroad with SYA France of School Year Abroad for his senior year of high school.  He learned how to sew by designing and sewing for dolls, and went on to study sculpture in Tokyo. At age sixteen Wu continued this career path by learning to create freelance doll clothing designs for toy company Integrity Toys under the lines "Jason Wu dolls" and later "Fashion Royalty". The following year, he was named creative director of Integrity Toys. While spending his senior year of high school in Rennes, France before graduating from the Loomis Chaffee School in 2001, he decided to become a fashion designer.  He then studied at the Parsons The New School for Design, a division of The New School in New York City, but did not graduate.

Career
Wu launched his ready-to-wear line of clothes with earnings from his years of doll designs.  His debut fashion collection was launched in 2006. He won the Fashion Group International's Rising Star award in 2008. Jason Wu's dresses were photographed underwater by Howard Schatz for Delta Faucet Company's Brizo branded faucet campaign in 2006. In 2008 he was nominated for the CFDA / Vogue Fashion Fund award. Bruce Weber shot the designer for W magazine's "Summer Camp" portfolio in July 2008.

Wu's early clients included Ivana Trump, January Jones, and Amber Valletta. He also worked extensively with drag queen RuPaul, ultimately designing six RuPaul dolls.

Wu collaborated with Creative Nail Design for his Spring 2011 collection to create a set of four nail polish colours that was to be retailed from May 2011.

In June 2013, Wu was named as the art director of German fashion house Hugo Boss overseeing the entire womenswear range.

In 2013, Wu launched his debut diffusion line (a collection designed with a younger target in mind and retailed at a lower price point), Miss Wu, in tandem with luxury retailer Nordstrom. Michelle Obama wore a Miss Wu green shift in 2012 — before it hit the shelves — while on the campaign trail for reelection. Relaunching the line as Grey in 2016, Wu partnered with Pantone to create a custom grey hue.

In 2020, Jason Wu launched an affordable line of clean makeup and skincare products under the label Jason Wu Beauty.

Designing for Michelle Obama
Michelle Obama is a noted Jason Wu customer.
She was introduced to Wu by André Leon Talley, Vogue Magazine'''s editor-at-large, who had been advising the then First Family on their appearance.  Obama bought four dresses from Wu early in the year, wearing one of them for a segment on Barbara Walters Special shortly before the November 2008 election, prompting many in the media to consider her his "career-launcher". She wore another dress, a custom-designed one-shoulder, floor-length white chiffon gown, at the inaugural balls on the night of President Barack Obama's first term inauguration.

Appearing on the cover of Vogue'', Obama once again wore a Wu design, a magenta silk dress. Upon her arrival in London in April 2009 during the First Lady and President Barack Obama's first official European trip, Obama wore a chartreuse silk sheath dress that was designed by Wu; the next day she wore a Wu coat during her visit with the Queen Elizabeth II. On April 2, 2009, Obama paired a "traditional looking" teal Wu dress with a blue-patterned cardigan designed by Junya Watanabe on her visit to the Royal Opera House.

Mrs. Obama again wore a dress that was designed by Wu, a ruby red velvet and chiffon design, at the 2013 Presidential Inaugural Balls.

Personal life
Wu, who is openly gay, married Gustavo Rangel in April 2016 in Mexico.

See also
 Taiwanese people in New York City
 LGBT culture in New York City
 List of LGBT people from New York City

References

External links 

Official website

1982 births
Living people
Artists from New York City
Artists from Taipei
Artists from Vancouver
Canadian fashion designers
Canadian expatriates in the United States
Canadian gay artists
High fashion brands
LGBT fashion designers
Taiwanese LGBT artists
Parsons School of Design alumni
People from Manhattan
Taiwanese emigrants to Canada
Taiwanese expatriates in the United States
Taiwanese fashion designers
Loomis Chaffee School alumni